Northern Cross may refer to:
 Northern Cross (asterism), an asterism in the constellation Cygnus
 Northern Cross (pilgrimage), an annual pilgrimage in northern England and the England-Scotland border
 Northern Cross, the section of the M50 motorway (Ireland), from Junctions 1 to 6, built in the late 1990s
 Northern Cross Railroad, first railroad in Illinois
 Northern Cross Radio Telescope at the Medicina Radio Observatory